The 2011 West Oxfordshire District Council election took place on 5 May 2011 to elect members of West Oxfordshire District Council in Oxfordshire, England. One third of the council was up for election and the Conservative Party stayed in overall control of the council.

After the election, the composition of the council was:
Conservative 44
Liberal Democrats 4
Labour 1

Background
After the 2010 West Oxfordshire District Council election the Conservatives controlled the council with 40 councillors, compared to seven for the Liberal Democrats and one each for Labour and an Independent. 16 seats were contested in 2011, with three Conservative cabinet members, Mark Booty, Richard Langridge and Warwick Robinson, defending seats, as well as the Liberal Democrat group leader Richard Andrews.

A total of 55 candidates stood for election, with 19 for the five seats in Witney alone. Both the Conservatives and the Green Party put up a full slate of 16 candidates, while Labour had 11 candidates, the Liberal Democrats 10 and there were two independents.

Election result
The Conservatives increased their control of the council, gaining four seats to have 44 councillors. Three of the Conservative gains came at the expense of the Liberal Democrats who dropped to four seats on the council, with the Liberal Democrat group leader Richard Andrews in Eynsham and Cassington being one of those who were defeated at the election. The other Liberal Democrat defeats came in Carterton South were Peter Madden lost his seat to Conservative Michael Brennan and in Charlbury and Finstock, where Michael Breakell had stepped down as a councillor at the election.

The fourth Conservative gain came in Stonesfield and Tackley where Charles Cottrell-Dormer won the seat as a Conservative, after having previously represented the ward as an independent. Meanwhile, Labour remained with one seat after Eve Coles held Chipping Norton for the party and Duncan Enright came second in Witney East with 1,006 votes, compared to 1,131 for Conservative Sian Davies. Overall 11 of the 13 sitting councillors who stood again were re-elected and average turnout at the election was 45.9%.

Ward results

References

2011 English local elections
2011
2010s in Oxfordshire